The 1947 Westland by-election was a by-election held during the 28th New Zealand Parliament in the South Island electorate of . The by-election occurred following the death of MP James O'Brien and was won by Jim Kent.

Background
This triggered the Westland by-election, which occurred on 3 December 1947.

Candidates
Labour
There were six nominations for the Labour Party candidacy:
Paddy Blanchfield, the Deputy Mayor of Greymouth and member of the Grey Power Board
W. J. Butler, a former Labour Party organiser and employee at the Grey River Argus newspaper
Ernie Heenan, a Hokitika businessman who was chairman of the Greymouth Harbour Board and member of the Westland Hospital Board
Jim Kent, a Greymouth Borough Councillor and former chairman of the Greymouth Harbour Board 
Mark Wallace, a Kokatahi farmer and member of the Westland County Council
Robert James Ware, district organiser of post office national savings and president of the Greymouth branch of the Labour Party and vice-president of the Westland Labour Representation Committee

The former Speaker of the House of Representatives and Auckland East MP Bill Schramm, who was defeated in 1946 and was originally from Hokitika, was also speculated as a possible candidate but later dismissed. Ware was selected as the candidate on 24 October. Five days later Ware was taken ill suddenly, the same day he was to have opened his campaign at a meeting in Ngahere. After receiving advice from his doctor he withdrew his candidacy. After Ware's withdrawal Kent was selected as the candidate on 31 October.

National
Several names were put forward for the National Party candidacy:
Gordon Gillespie, a Greymouth businessman
Jack Lockington, a farmer from Reefton
Martin Nestor, the National Party's chief research officer

Two previous National candidates from past elections, Ted Taylor and Frank Chivers, were also considered. Both declined nomination, as did Patrick Joseph O'Regan, a farmer from Inangahua Junction, owing to health reasons. Lockington was selected by a meeting of delegates and members of the Westland electoral committee at Greymouth on 28 October.

Others
After being unsuccessful in attaining the official Labour nomination, there was speculation that Wallace would stand as an Independent Labour candidate. This did not eventuate however.

Previous election

Results
The following table gives the election results:

Kent obtained 57.9% of the votes and was successful.

See also
List of New Zealand by-elections

Notes

References

Westland
Westl
Politics of the West Coast, New Zealand
December 1947 events in New Zealand